The 2019–20 East Midlands Counties Football League season was the 12th of the East Midlands Counties Football League, a football competition in England at level 10 of the English football league system.

The allocations for Steps 1 to 6 for season 2019–20 were announced by the FA on 19 May. These were subject to appeal, and the East Midlands Counties' constitution was subject to ratification at the league's AGM on 25 June.

As a result of the COVID-19 pandemic, this season's competition was formally abandoned on 26 March 2020, with all results from the season being expunged, and no promotion or relegation taking place to or from the competition. On 30 March 2020, sixty-six non-league clubs sent an open letter to the Football Association requesting that they reconsider their decision.

Premier Division

The league featured 16 clubs from the previous season, along with three new clubs:
 Dunkirk, relegated from the Midland League Premier Division
 Hucknall Town, promoted from the Central Midlands League
 Shirebrook Town, transferred from Northern Counties East League Division One

Also, FC Bolsover were transferred from Northern Counties East League Division One but resigned before the start of the season.

League table

Stadia and locations

References

External links
 East Midlands Counties Football League

2019-20
10
Association football events curtailed and voided due to the COVID-19 pandemic